The Aaron's Company is an American lease-to-own retailer. The company focuses on leases and retail sales of furniture, electronics, appliances, and computers. The company sells through the company-operated and franchised stores, e-commerce platform (Aarons.com)

Locations 
, the Aaron's Company has 1,340 stores: 1,092 company-operated stores (in 43 states and Canada) and 248 independently owned and operated franchised stores in 35 states and Canada.

History 
Aaron Rents, Inc. was founded by R. Charles Loudermilk, Sr. in 1955.

In September 2008, Aaron's announced the sale of its Corporate Furnishings division to CORT Business Services, part of Berkshire Hathaway. Aaron's Corporate Furnishings division, which operated 47 stores, recorded revenues of approximately $99 million in 2007.

As of December 31, 2016, Aaron's had 1,864 stores located in 28 states and the District of Columbia and Canada. In addition, they had 699 independently owned franchised stores in 46 states and Canada.

On July 29, 2020, Aaron's Holdings Company, Inc. announced plans to split into two companies: PROG Holdings, Inc. and The Aaron's Company, Inc. PROG Holdings, with the ticker symbol "PRG", remained in the S&P Midcap 400 stock index but its Global Industry Classification Standard was changed to "Consumer Finance". The Aaron's Company continueed to trade under the ticker symbol "AAN" but was moved into the S&P Smallcap 600.

Controversy 
In February 2013, customers sued Aaron's for allegedly using spyware on rented computers to send over 185,000 emails to the rental company, including customers' Social Security numbers, passwords and captured keystrokes, as well as explicit images.  The Aaron's Company officials had previously said that the company had not installed the spyware, and individual franchisees were responsible. In October 2013, Aaron's agreed to a settlement with the Federal Trade Commission that limited how it used monitoring technology and ordered it to delete customer information that had been improperly collected.

Sponsorships 

 NASCAR racing: Aaron's entered NASCAR jumping in between multiple teams and drivers, sponsoring drivers such as Johnny Benson Jr., Kenny Wallace, and Hermie Sadler. In 2008, Aaron's then became the full-time sponsor for the team Michael Waltrip Racing in NASCAR's Monster Energy Cup Series for a couple of years, sponsoring drivers such as David Reutimann, Michael McDowell, Mark Martin, Brian Vickers, and David Ragan in a scheme that was named the "Aaron's Dream Machine". Aaron's was also the namesake of the spring race at Talladega Superspeedway, the Aaron's 499, along with the Xfinity Series spring race at the track, the Aaron's 312, from 2002 to 2014. Aaron's also sponsored Clint Bowyer for a single race in Atlanta during the 2016 season. The year after, Aaron's sponsored Michael Waltrip in his last race.
 National Hot Rod Association racing: Aaron's sponsored Don Schumacher Racing in the NHRA Camping World Drag Racing Series. They sponsored Funny Car driver Jack Beckman and Top Fuel driver Antron Brown.

See also
 List of S&P 600 companies
 Furlenco

References

Sources

External links 

 
 
 Aaron's Sales and Lease Ownership website
 Home Staging by Aaron's - Home Staging Furniture Fulfilled by Aaron's 
 HOMESMART - Subsidiary of Aaron's Inc.
 Aaron Inc SEC Filings

Companies listed on the New York Stock Exchange
Companies based in Atlanta
Retail companies established in 1955
Furniture retailers of the United States
Renting
Franchises
1955 establishments in Georgia (U.S. state)